Bompietro (Sicilian: Bompietru) is a comune (municipality) in the Metropolitan City of Palermo in the Italian region Sicily, located about  southeast of Palermo.

Bompietro borders the following municipalities: Alimena, Blufi, Calascibetta, Gangi, Petralia Soprana, Resuttano, Villarosa.

References

Municipalities of the Metropolitan City of Palermo